The  mixed individual BC1 boccia event at the 2016 Summer Paralympics was contested from 13 September to 16 September at Sambodromo in Rio de Janeiro. 16 competitors took part.

The event structure was amended from the 2012 event, with pool stages added. The top two players from each of four pools then entered into a quarter final single elimination stage, with the losing semifinalists playing off for bronze.

2012 silver medalist, Great Britain's David Smith, won the gold medal, his second ever and first in an individual event, over the Netherlands' Daniel Perez, with Korea's Yoo Won-jeong beating Antonio Marques of Portugal for the bronze medal.

Final Stages

Pool stages

Pool A

Pool B

Pool C

Pool D

References

Individual BC1